Saveli Chitanava is the current Chairman of the State Committee for Ecology and the Environment of Abkhazia. Chitanava was appointed on 21 October 2014 by newly elected President Raul Khajimba.

References

Living people
Chairmen of the State Committee for Ecology of Abkhazia
Year of birth missing (living people)